Windrow is an unincorporated community in Rutherford County, Tennessee, United States.

Notes

Unincorporated communities in Rutherford County, Tennessee
Unincorporated communities in Tennessee